Thrive (stylized as THRIVE) is the sixth studio album by American contemporary Christian music band Casting Crowns. Released on January 28, 2014 through Beach Street and Reunion Records, the album was produced by Mark A. Miller. Musically, the album, whose concept was inspired by Psalms 1 from the Bible, has a rock and contemporary Christian sound with influences from folk and bluegrass. The album received mostly positive reviews from music critics for its lyrics and musical diversity, but some critics felt that some songs were too similar to the work of other artists or to their own previous work.

Thrive sold 43,000 copies in the United States in its first week of release; although this was short of projections to sell 75,000 copies, it peaked at No. 6 on the Billboard 200 and No. 1 on the Billboard Christian Albums chart, while also charting in Australia, Canada, the Netherlands, and the UK. The album was preceded by the lead single "All You've Ever Wanted", which peaked at No. 3 on the Billboard Christian Songs chart. It has been certified Gold by the Recording Industry Association of America (RIAA).

Background and composition
Thrive was recorded at Zoo Studio in Franklin, Tennessee, with producer Mark A. Miller. According to lead vocalist Mark Hall, the idea behind Thrive came from the student ministry he is involved in. As a youth pastor, Hall frequently uses Psalms 1, which metaphorically compares the concept of a righteous man to a prosperous tree planted by a river. Hall said that many people he has talked with are simply surviving, which he feels contrasts with this — he felt that, although hard times can come upon anyone, people are not put in these situations to simply survive through them, but rather to thrive through the adversity. Using the metaphor, Hall noted that, if one were to pull away all the dirt from around a tree, one would find roots digging into the ground in addition to the limbs of the tree reaching out. Hall elaborated that "you need to get your strength from God; you don’t get it on your own. If you’re all limbs, the thorns of life will knock you over. You need to dig your roots in and let God reach out through you". Accordingly, half of the record focuses on 'reaching out', while the other half focuses on 'digging deep'. Hall described the record as being "an effort to draw a picture of what a believer, a follower of Jesus, would look like if they dug into their roots and understood God and themselves more, and then instead of trying to go be Christian for God, they just let God give them chances to be a Christian".

The music on Thrive has been described as contemporary Christian; and rock it was also described as "mid '90s grunge rock with country flair" and the album as having "rock, pop, and worship" songs. Thrive was also noted to have influences from folk and bluegrass at times. The main instruments used on the album include the electric guitar, acoustic guitar, and piano. The songs have been called anthems that are intended for people in both jovial and trying times.

The first song on the album, the title track "Thrive", has been described as having a folk pop sound  similar to Mumford and Sons or Phillip Phillips. The banjo and mandolin are used in its arrangement in addition to electric guitars and backing vocals. "All You've Ever Wanted" is led by a piano riff, and displays an adult contemporary sound similar to much of the rest of the band's discography. "Just Be Held" also incorporates adult contemporary elements, with one critic comparing the song's string arrangement to those on Downton Abbey, while "You Are the Only One" is a worship song. "Broken Together", described as "Coldplay pop", is a piano ballad; the song's protagonist "smashes the facade of a fairy-tale relationship, forgoing the happy ending with the realization that 'maybe you and I were never meant to be complete'".

"Love You with the Truth" is an orchestral rock song, and has been described as a softer version of the music of Skillet. "This Is Now" and "Dream for You" utilize a mix of electric and acoustic guitars, with the latter noted as having a "bluesy" sound. "Follow Me", a ballad with folk influences, is sung by Megan Garrett. "House of Their Dreams" thematically revolves around a family that has pursued material interests at the expense of being together; musically, the song was compared to a softer version of the band's song "American Dream". "Waiting on the Night to Fall" is a warning against Satan, urging listeners not to become complacent.

Release and promotion 
Prior to the release of Thrive, "All You've Ever Wanted" was released as the album's lead single. The song was released to Christian AC radio on September 14, 2013 and as a digital download on September 24, 2013. The song has peaked at No. 3 on the Billboard Christian Songs chart, No. 10 on the Christian Airplay chart, and No. 2 on the Christian Digital Songs chart. Two other songs were released as downloads prior to the album's release: "Thrive", which peaked at No. 10 on the Christian Songs chart  and No. 3 on the Christian Digital Songs chart, and "This Is Now", which peaked at No. 15 on the Christian Songs chart and No. 3 on the Christian Digital Songs chart. Following the release of the album, two other songs ("Broken Together" and "Just Be Held") charted on the Christian Songs chart at No. 45 and 50, respectively.

Thrive was released on January 28, 2014. Billboard projected the album would sell around 75,000 copies in the United States in its first week, enough for a top-ten debut on the Billboard 200 and a No. 1 debut on the Christian Albums chart. The album ultimately sold 43,000 units, debuting at No. 1 on the Christian Albums chart, No. 6 on the Billboard 200, and No. 8 on the Digital Albums chart. It went on to become the best-selling Christian album of 2014, shifting 339,000 copies throughout the year.

The album also charted internationally. It debuted at No. 23 on the Billboard Canadian Albums Chart and No. 52 on the Dutch Albums chart. Although it did not chart on the main UK Albums Chart, it did reach No. 1 on the UK's Official Christian & Gospel Albums Chart; it also appeared on the Australia Hitseekers Albums chart, which ranks the top albums by artists who have not yet reached the top 50 on the main Australian Albums Chart.

Critical reception 

Thrive received mostly positive reviews from music critics. The album's songwriting and musical diversity were generally praised. Joshua Andre of Christian Music Zine awarded the album four and a half out of five stars, describing the lyrics as "profound" while praising the music as the most innovative and varied the band had put out to date. Lins Honeyman of Cross Rhythms rated the album nine out of ten squares, calling it "outstanding" and praising its musically diversity. He also praised the band, saying they were "refreshingly willing to take a chance and most certainly at the top of the game". Jonathan Andre of Indie Vision Music rated Thrive four out of five stars, calling it the band's "most personal and musically diverse album to date". Kate Padilla of The Daily Reporter praised both the album's songwriting and sound, and felt that the album could be appreciated, regardless of whether or not the buyer listens to Christian radio.

Other critics praised the album's overall quality, both in comparison to the band's previous work and the Christian music genre. Ed Cardinal of Crosswalk.com described Thrive as "top quality" and described the majority of the album was marked by "intensity", and said "It may not be the easiest, breeziest listen... but this album can help fight that dark enemy with every play". Kevin Davis of New Release Tuesday rated Thrive four and a half stars, ranking the album's songs as among the best he had heard from group and saying that it is "sure to be one of the year's best [albums]". Laura Chambers of Christian Music Review rated the album 4.9 out of 5, describing it as "one of the best albums I’ve heard in a long time". Although she noted the album covered some lyrical topics the band had discussed before, she felt this was not a bad thing, considering it "less of a rehash and more of a reminder". Jeremy Armstrong of Worship Leader rated Thrive three and a half out of five stars, praising the band as having a "broad appeal" and describing the album as a "fine release". At CM Addict, Brianne Bellomy rated the album four stars out of five, remarking that the release "is another power packed album full of songs that speak to everyone". At About.com, Kim Jones rated Thrive four-and-a-half stars out of five, praising the album as being "delivered with [...] passion" and saying that it has "arrows [pointed] straight to the heart".

Other critics presented a more mixed response; Mark Rice of Jesus Freak Hideout rated the album three out of five stars, arguing it was an improvement over their previous efforts in some respects but feeling it was, for the most part, either "stagnation or regression". Although Piet Levy of the Milwaukee Journal Sentinel praised the songwriting, saying it "stands out [...] at times featuring troubled protagonists and earned redemption", he felt several songs sounded too similar to the work of other artists. Brian Mansfield of USA Today rated it two and a half out of four stars, describing the band as "chameleonic" but praising "House of Their Dreams" and "Broken Together".

Track listing

Personnel 
Credits taken from Allmusic

Casting Crowns
 Mark Hall – vocals
 Megan Garrett – keyboards, acoustic piano, backing vocals 
 Juan DeVevo – acoustic guitar, electric guitar
 Josh Mix – electric guitar
 Melodee DeVevo – violin, backing vocals
 Chris Huffman – bass
 Brian Scoggin – drums

Additional musicians
 Bernie Herms – keyboards, programming 
 Blair Masters – keyboards, programming 
 Tom Bukovac – acoustic guitar, electric guitar
 Stuart Garrard – electric guitar
 Jerry McPherson – electric guitar
 Jason Roller – acoustic guitar, banjo, mandolin
 Adam Nitti – bass
 Bobby Huff – drums, percussion

The Nashville Recording Orchestra
 Bernie Herms – string arrangements, orchestration
 Jim Gray – conductor, orchestration
 Brent Baker – music preparation
 Jonathan O'Hara – music preparation
 John Catchings – cello
 Anthony LaMarchina – cello, viola (5)
 Sarighani Reist – cello
 Monisa Angell – viola
 Chris Farrell – viola
 Jim Grosjean – viola, cello (5)
 David Angell – violin
 Carrie Bailey – violin
 Janet Darnall – violin
 David Davidson – violin, concertmaster
 Erin Hall – violin
 Betsy Lamb – violin
 Pamela Sixfin – violin
 Mary Kathryn Vanosdale – violin
 Karen Winkelmann – violin

Technical
 Sam Hewitt – recording 
 Billy Lord – vocal recording 
 David Schober – orchestra recording 
 Dale Griffin – recording assistant
 Lia Harrison – recording assistant
 Rody Inestroza – recording assistant
 Eric Jackson – recording assistant
 Chris Ivey – recording assistant
 Nick Spezia – orchestra recording assistant 
 Steve Lowery – mixing
 Shayne Hill – digital editing
 Bobby Huff – digital editing
 Joe Palmaccio – mastering at The Place...For Mastering, Nashville, Tennessee

Production
 Mark A. Miller – producer 
 Terry Hemmings – executive producer
 Jason McArthur – A&R
 Michelle Box – A&R production 
 Russ Harrington – photography
 Silas Huffman – tributee
 Beth Lee – art direction
 Tim Parker – art direction, design

Charts 
Billboard named the album No. 1 for 2014 on its Christian Albums chart.

Weekly charts

Year-end charts

Single charts

Certifications

References 

Reunion Records albums
Casting Crowns albums
2014 albums